Polyarny Airport  (also Udachnaya or Poliarny) is an airport in Yakutia, Russia located 1 km west of Novy and about 12 km west of Udachny. It services all types of aircraft.  The airfield is built on a 4000 x 190 m gravel base, with the first 100 m of runway unusable for takeoff.  It is designated as an emergency airfield for cross-polar airline traffic between North America and Asia. The airport serves as base for regional airline ALROSA.

Airlines and destinations

References

Soviet Air Force bases
Airports built in the Soviet Union
Airports in the Sakha Republic